Smołdzino may refer to:

Smołdzino, Kartuzy County, Poland
Smołdzino, Słupsk County, Poland